The B.C. Home Owner Mortgage and Equity partnership is a program offered by the Executive Council of British Columbia  to first-time homebuyers who have been either citizens or permanent residents of Canada for the last five years and have been residents of British Columbia  for at least a year before applying and have never owned a home. The province offers qualifying individuals an amount to match their down payment which is limited to 5% of the purchase price of a home not exceeding $750,000.

Applications can be filed starting January 17, 2017.

External links
https://web.archive.org/web/20161220104911/http://housingaction.gov.bc.ca/tile/home-owner-mortgage-and-equity-partnership

Housing finance in Canada